Marc Davis (born December 17, 1969, in Oceanside, California) is a retired American track and field athlete, who mainly competed in distance races like the men's 3000 metres steeplechase and 5000 metres. His personal bests are 13:32.58 in the 5000 m set in 1989 and 8:14.26 in the steeplechase set in 1993.

Davis first gained fame while running for San Diego High School (the same alma mater as American distance star Meb Keflezighi), winning the Foot Locker Cross Country Championships, the equivalent of national championships, on his home course before a national TV audience.

Next Davis ran for the University of Arizona, winning the 1992 3000 m Steeple Chase NCAA Men's Outdoor Track and Field Championships.

At the USA Outdoor Track and Field Championships he won the 1993 steeplechase and in 1998 he won the 5000 metres.  On the roads he won the 1997 National 5K Championship.

At the 1996 Summer Olympics, Davis won his semi-final in the steeplechase, before finishing 12th in the final.

In 1998, Davis represented the United States in the IAAF World Cross country championships in Marrakech, Morocco, placing 12th overall.

Personal bests

International competitions

References

External links
 Marc Davis at USATF
 
 
 

1969 births
Living people
Sportspeople from Oceanside, California
Track and field athletes from California
American male steeplechase runners
American male middle-distance runners
American male long-distance runners
Olympic track and field athletes of the United States
Athletes (track and field) at the 1996 Summer Olympics
World Athletics Championships athletes for the United States
Arizona Wildcats men's track and field athletes
Goodwill Games medalists in athletics
Arizona Wildcats men's cross country runners
Competitors at the 1994 Goodwill Games

San Diego High School alumni